The Modelo Formation is a Miocene geologic formation  in the Simi Hills and western Santa Susana Mountains of southern California.

It preserves fossils dating back to the Late Miocene of the Neogene period.

See also

 List of fossiliferous stratigraphic units in California
 Paleontology in California

References
 

Miocene geology
Neogene California
Shale formations of the United States
Geologic formations of California
Paleontology in California
Geology of Los Angeles County, California
Geology of Ventura County, California
Simi Hills
Santa Susana Mountains